Ned Eisenberg (January 13, 1957 – February 27, 2022) was an American actor known for his recurring role on Law & Order: Special Victims Unit as Roger Kressler.

Early life and education
Eisenberg grew up in the Riverdale neighborhood of the Bronx. He graduated from Riverdale Junior High School in 1972 and from there went on to the Performing Arts High School, a subsidiary of Fiorello H. LaGuardia High School. He described himself as a "street-style" actor, coming up through the ranks rather than academic programs, and his training included jazz-dance classes with Betsy Haug.

Career
Eisenberg had a leading role in the film Key Exchange (1985), followed by a major tour of the Broadway play Brighton Beach Memoirs, and guest starred on various 1980s television series such as The Equalizer and Miami Vice. This led to a starring role in the television comedy The Fanelli Boys, which also starred Christopher Meloni and Joe Pantoliano. He also played supporting roles in films such as The Exterminator (1980), The Burning (1981), Slayground (1983), Moving Violations (1985), Air America (1990), Last Man Standing (1996), Primary Colors (1998), A Civil Action (1998), Woody Allen's Celebrity (1998), and Experimenter (2015).

In 1987, he cofounded the Naked Angels Theatre Company with longtime friend Fisher Stevens.

Beginning in 1997, Eisenberg appeared on the NBC series Law & Order, typically playing a defense attorney. He had a recurring role on spinoff Law & Order: Special Victims Unit as defense attorney Roger Kressler. In 1999, he appeared in the first season episode of The Sopranos ("Denial, Anger, Acceptance") as Ariel. He also continued his film career by appearing in Clint Eastwood's Academy Award–winning drama Million Dollar Baby (2004) and played the role of photographer Joe Rosenthal in the 2006 film Flags of Our Fathers, also directed by Eastwood.

Personal life and death
Eisenberg was married to actress Patricia Dunnock, and had one son. 

Eisenberg died from complications of cholangiocarcinoma at his home in New York, on February 27, 2022, at the age of 65.

In the last two years of his life, Eisenberg continued to work while fighting the cancer in private, ensuring that he and his family still had medical coverage and financial stability due to his earnings.

Filmography

Film

Television

References

External links

 

1957 births
2022 deaths
20th-century American Jews
20th-century American male actors
21st-century American Jews
21st-century American male actors
American male film actors
American male television actors
Deaths from cancer in New York (state)
Deaths from cholangiocarcinoma
Deaths from uveal melanoma
Jewish American male actors
Male actors from New York City
People from Riverdale, Bronx